John Augustine Snow (born 13 October 1941) is a retired English cricketer. He played for Sussex and England in the 1960s and 1970s. Snow was England's most formidable fast bowler between Fred Trueman and Bob Willis and played Test Matches with both of them at either end of his career. He is known for bowling England to victory against the West Indies in 1967–68 and Australia in 1970–71 and was a Wisden Cricketer of the Year in 1973.

Snow was involved in several on-field incidents stemming from his aggressive, short-pitched bowling. He was considered difficult to handle, had definite ideas on how and when he should bowl and was disciplined by both Sussex and England, but perfectly fitted the public image of a fiery fast bowler. His disdain for the cricketing authorities at Sussex and Lord's was aptly summed up in his autobiography Cricket Rebel as was his decision to play for Kerry Packer's World Series Cricket in 1977–79.

Early life
Snow was born in Peopleton, Worcestershire, the son of a Scottish vicar who took up a living in the Diocese of Worcester at the village of Elmley Castle. When he was born his grandfather, a cricket coach, rang his father in Scotland to announce that "It's a young cricketer!" and he was given a cricket bat to chew when he was a baby. He learned how to play in the three-acre grounds of the vicarage with his father, mother, grandfather and three sisters and later in village matches. Snow's rural childhood was completely unaffected by the war or rationing and he used to chop down trees for firewood, excellent exercise for the muscles needed for fast bowling (Frank Tyson was once a tree-feller).

First educated at Christ's Hospital, he moved to Chichester High School for Boys the year before his father became vicar at nearby Bognor Regis, where he was trained by the Warwickshire batsman Len Bates. Living in Sussex he joined the Bognor Colts, as had Peter May and David Sheppard before him, and had the great honour of being bowled by Frank Worrell when they played Antilles. He also began playing games for the Sussex Young Amateurs and Junior Marletts. As a teenager he had been a better batsman than a bowler, but as more boys wanted to bat than bowl he concentrated on the latter.  He also played rugby throughout his teens, at full-back, but gave up the game in 1961 to concentrate on his cricket career. He attended Culham Teachers Training College near Abingdon, on a three-year course studying geography and physical education from 1963 to 1965, including as part of his training taught at Woodingdean County Primary School in what is now East Sussex, but his studies suffered as he played more First Class Cricket.

Development and approach
Snow started his First Class Cricket and Test Match career as a fast-medium seam bowler. He tended to bowl chest-on, which enabled inswing but limited chances of lbw decisions and restricted his pace. It took him three years to control this habit, and he "finally began to sort it out" when he played club cricket, as well as coached, in South Africa (after he was not chosen for the 1965–66 Ashes tour of Australia). The process was helped by the less intense schedule in South Africa and the hard, fast and bouncy wickets.

His work resulted in a more classical sideways-on action, and "I became a bowler of genuine pace." The new style pleased the purists who referred to his "graceful, yet deadly, action", and "beautifully easy and controlled bowling method, slanting the ball into the batsman but also cutting it sharply off the pitch". 
From beyond the boundary, it is difficult to gauge Snow's pace as Lindsay Hassett conceded. He appears to bowl his bumper appreciably faster than most of his fuller-length deliveries, but I do not believe even his faster bumper knocks at the door of the pace of bowlers I have named. His top pace, I consider, lies somewhere between that of Statham and Trueman...Snow's loping, almost lazy run, of course, is sinisterly deceptive. It is in that last stride, or last two strides, when that long, straight powerful arm gathers its impetus and either whips or coasts through, that the potential is born.
Richard Whitington
</blockquote>

Snow had the ability, like Charlie Griffith in the West Indies side of the 1960s, to drop the ball slightly short and get it to lift painfully into the batsmen's body". As a result, he struck several batsmen on the head, Greg Chappell at Hove in 1968 when he was playing for Somerset and the tailenders Garth McKenzie and Terry Jenner in the Sydney Tests of 1970–71. Ian Chappell said that he always found something new in his bowling repertoire whenever he began a new series against him.

Unlike Trueman and Statham, Snow had no regular new-ball partner, teaming up with David Brown, Jeff Jones, Alan Ward, Chris Old, Ken Shuttleworth, Peter Lever, Bob Willis, Geoff Arnold and others. Though his career overlapped that of Willis in 1971–76, injuries and selection problems prevented them from forming the impressive duo that they might have been.

In 1967 Snow jarred his back while bowling against India at Edgbaston. X-rays found that he had a sacroiliac joint abnormality which had become inflamed and that the only cure was traction and complete rest. As a result, Snow became very insistent that he not be overbowled and was frequently accused of "not trying" when he was too ill to field properly. Once Ted Dexter made him bowl throughout a session for Sussex and he took a week to recover. When not bowling Snow often lounged around the outfield – ignoring the game if he felt it wasn't going anywhere – but had a fine throwing arm when he wanted to use it.

Snow was conscious of conserving energy, and not being overbowled.Snow believes that both Andy Roberts,p41, and Dennis Lillee,p134, saw reduced effectiveness due to being overbowled, John Snow, 'Cricket Rebel' He usually bowled only fast-medium in run-of-the-mill county and tour games, and saved his fast bowling for Test Matches and when the mood took him on the pacey wickets at Hove. The best example is the Australian Tour of 1970–71 when he took 31 wickets (22.83) in the six tests, but only 7 wickets (71.57) in the six other first-class matches on the tour. Even in Tests "he varied his pace cleverly, rarely bowling flat-out for a whole over, but unleashing the odd very quick delivery.

Snow prepared mentally for big games."Test matches... require great mental effort," John Snow, 'Cricket Rebel', p120

County career with Sussex
Ideally a bowler of John Snow's tremendous pace should be used in short spells with adequate rest in between and he is usually more impressive and effective as a result. I knew this as well as he did but much as I wanted to help him, I had to be tough with John. Often I was forced to keep him on for lengthy spells because this was necessary for the team's success.
The Nawab of Pataudi, captain of Sussex
Snow was recommended to Sussex County Cricket Club by the Sussex player and coach Ken Suttle as a batsman because he was a "magnificent hitter of the ball", but that his bowling was "erratic and not very hopeful". He quickly developed as a fast seam bowler who could knock batsmen on the head with his short balls, but who batted at number ten. He first played first-class cricket in the Glamorgan vs Sussex match at Cardiff Arms Park as an amateur in 1961, taking 2/12 and 3/67 and making 12 in his only innings. However, it was not until 1964 that he won his county cap and became a regular in the Sussex side, by which time he had become a professional player. He helped Sussex to win the Gillette Cup Final against Worcestershire in 1963, taking 3/13 on his cup debut, and Warwickshire in 1964, when he took 2/28. In the 1960s Sussex had four seam bowlers and no spinners, which was excellent for the Gillette Cup and the green wicket at Hove, but not elsewhere. Snow believed this cost them the County Championship in 1963 (they came 4th) as several games drifted away on a turning wicket with only part-time spinners in the team. Once Snow was established in the side and a Test bowler he was used for long spells on unresponsive wickets and he gained a reputation for "not trying" and he occasionally refused to bowl. Snow berated "the Sussex committee for their lack of guidance, initiative, communication, drive and general handling, which affected the growth of the club and team spirit". They in turn were displeased that he saved his best bowling for England. Nevertheless, Snow took 883 wickets (21.30) for Sussex in 1961–77 and was by far their most successful bowler of the period.

1974 was his benefit season at Sussex. In 1975 he took his best First-class cricket bowling figures of 8/87 (11/112) playing for Sussex against Middlesex at Lord's.

England under M. J. K. Smith 1965
Snow made his Test debut against New Zealand under captain M. J. K. Smith at Lord's in the Second Test of 1965. It was Fred Trueman's last test and Snow's Sussex teammates Ted Dexter and wicket-keeper Jim Parks were also in the side. New Zealand had already slumped to 28–4 when Snow was brought on, but he got two wickets before lunch, the New Zealand captain John Reid caught behind by Parks and the wicket-keeper Artie Dick clean bowled. He strained a side muscle before the Third Test, but returned to play in the Second Test against South Africa at Trent Bridge. Here Graeme (126) and Peter Pollock (10/87) won the match and Snow (1/63 & 3/83) was dropped both for the last Test and the M.C.C. tour of Australia.

England under Brian Close 1966–67
In 1966 Gary Sobers' powerful West Indian team toured England and Snow was recalled after his 7/29 and 4/18 destroyed them before 10,000 people at Hove when Sussex beat the tourists by 9 wickets. He took 4/84 and 0/117 in the Third Test at Trent Bridge and 3/143 in the Fourth at Headingley but the West Indies won them both to go 3–0 up in the series and the formidable Brian Close was made captain for the final Test. Snow was initially dropped for The Oval, but was recalled due to the injury to the recalled John Price, then considered the fastest bowler in England. It was the turning point of his career as England collapsed to 166 for 7, before Tom Graveney 165 and John Murray 112 consolidated, but it still left England a little short of a commanding score until Snow hit eight boundaries in his 59 not out and added 128 with fellow bowler Ken Higgs, who made 63. This was two runs short of the then Test record for the tenth wicket, and is still a Test record for the last wicket between England and the West Indies. It remains as the all-time Test match record partnership between batsmen 10 and 11. They retired to the pavilion for a beer afterwards, but had their pints hurriedly replaced by teacups for their newspaper picture by officials concerned with the image of the game. Snow's 59 not out was the first test 50 by an England number 11 batsman and remained a record until Jimmy Anderson made 81 against India in 2014. Snow (2/66 & 3/40) removed the West Indian openers Conrad Hunte and Easton McMorris for 12 runs in the second innings, Close caught Sobers off him for a first ball duck and England won a stunning victory by an innings and 34 runs. Sobers explained that "the ball from Snow bounced a bit but I suppose I was beaten by the speed more than anything. I didn't get hold of it properly, edged it into my body. It flew out to Brian and that was that". John Snow became a national hero and until 1973 was England's premier fast bowler and a regular player in the England Test team. This Test was the first of a run of 40 with only one defeat in 1966–71, of which Snow played 32. There was no tour in 1966–67 and in the summer of 1967 he took 13 wickets (30.00) against India and Pakistan, but missed the last two tests because of an inflammation of his sacroiliac joint.

England under Colin Cowdrey 1967–69

The West Indies 1967–68
Brian Close's forthright views had never been welcome at Lord's and the affable Colin Cowdrey returned to lead the M.C.C. tour of the West Indies in 1967–68. It was here that Snow really made his mark in international cricket. Although he was not picked for the first test, which was drawn, Snow had the advantage of being fully acclimatised by the Second Test. He took 7/49 at Jamaica, including in his haul the opener Steve Camacho, Rohan Kanhai, Gary Sobers (lbw for another first ball duck), Basil Butcher, David Holford, Charlie Griffith and Wes Hall as the West Indies were scuttled for 143. Rioting interrupted play when the crowd objected to Butcher's dismissal, even though he walked. Riot police and tear gas were used to restore order and the incident allowed the West Indies team to recover their poise against the now unsettled tourists. They made 391 following on (Snow 1/91) and England were reduced to 68/8 at the end of the last day, which was played before an empty stadium. Sobers decided to bat on a flat wicket at Barbados, but Snow (5/80) restricted them to 349. England made 449 and the home team batted out the game with 284/6, Snow claiming 3/39. Ironically England won the series at Trinidad with no help from Snow (0/68 and 1/29) thanks to a sporting declaration by Gary Sobers giving England two and three quarter hours to make 215 for victory, which they did for the loss of three wickets with three minutes to spare. Snow finished the series with 4/84 and 6/60 in Guyana, his 10/144 being his best Test figures and his only 10-wicket haul. Even so, England barely survived; 209–9 at stumps on the last day and staring defeat in the face as Gary Sobers (3/53) and Lance Gibbs (6/60) whirred through the overs. Snow played his part lasting 60 balls and 45 minutes before he was out for 1 on the last evening. Rohan Kanhai had repeatedly told him in 1966 that "We'll smash you all over the park when we get you on those wickets in the Caribbean", but Snow had taken 27 wickets (18.66) in four tests. This remains the most wickets taken by an England bowler in a series in the West Indies, though it was equalled by Angus Fraser in 1997–98 when he took 27 wickets (18.22) in six tests. Snow was instrumental in England's second series victory in the Caribbean, and they would have to wait 36 years for the next.

The Ashes 1968
In 1968 the Australians toured England and they retained The Ashes in a rain-sodden 1–1 draw. They beat England by 159 runs in the First Test at Old Trafford, Snow taking 4/94 on his Ashes debut, but England had only one spinner on a wicket that increasingly turned. In the next Test at Lord's, Australia were out for 78 (Snow 1/14) and followed on, but the match was drawn because of rain. It is also notable as the first of 27 consecutive Tests that England would play without loss in 1968–71, of which Snow was proud to play 22. At Headingley Keith Fletcher made his Test debut and dropped two catches in the slips off Snow (3/98), one to his right and one to his left. The final Test at The Oval was won by Derek Underwood with three minutes to spare after the ground was flooded, Snow and eight other close fielders almost playing "Ring a Ring o' Roses" round the luckless Australian batsman. Snow took 3/67 in the first innings and ended with 17 wickets (29.08), only Underwood with 20 wickets (15.10) taking more.

Pakistan 1968–69
Snow's second tour was to Ceylon then East and West Pakistan in 1968–69. The country was in a state of confusion, with armed students taking control of Dacca and insisting that the tour continue. The M.C.C. team were assured by the British High Commission that they would be safe even as they themselves were making plans for an emergency evacuation. Cowdrey asked Snow to give him a few overs at full stretch in the nets before the First Test to test his fitness, but Snow refused as he had not exercised for two days and bowled only medium pace. As a result, he was dropped "because of his attitude", but was recalled for the Second Test at Dacca where he took 4/70 in the first innings. The Tests were all drawn and the tour was abandoned when rioting broke out on the third day at Lahore and the stadium was set on fire. Snow took no more wickets, but caught a bout of dysentery, which required him to take medication for over a year.

England under Ray Illingworth 1969–73

Snow respected and appreciated Illingworth's captaincy.

The West Indies 1969

Colin Cowdrey snapped his Achilles tendon and the selectors made the surprise choice of Ray Illingworth as his replacement. Illingworth was another tough Yorkshireman, but had moved to Leicestershire as captain in 1969 after a contract dispute. He was seen as a caretaker captain, but made the job his own and kept it even after the old captain had recovered. He started well, with Snow taking 4/54 when the West Indies crashed to 147 all out at Old Trafford and lost by an innings. At Lord's the West Indies chose to bat and reached 324/5 before Snow took 5/114 to get them out for 380. Illingworth saved the English innings with a century to cement his place as captain and the Test ended in a thrilling draw with England needing 37 runs with three wickets in hand. It was here that Snow "penned in verse my feelings and impressions about what it is like to play at the headquarters of world cricket" in his poem "Lord's Test". In the Third Test at Headingley there was a problem when Illingworth asked Snow to "give me everything you've got" when the West Indians were 240/7 needing 303 to win, but Snow found the pitch lifeless, changed to medium-paced seamers, failed to take a wicket and Illingworth was not best pleased. England still won the Test by 30 runs and the series 2–0 and Snow was the chief wicket-taker with 15 (27.06) It the last time England would beat the West Indies for 31 years.

New Zealand 1969
For the First Test against New Zealand Snow was told by the chairman of the selectors Alec Bedser that he was dropped so that they could watch Alan Ward in a Test match, but Illingworth rang in the middle of the Essex vs Sussex match to tell Snow straight that he was dropped for disobeying his orders in the Test. Snow was particularly annoyed as a television firm had arranged to film him at Lord's to make a fifteen-minute programme with John Betjeman about Snow's poem "Lord's Test", which was now cancelled. The immediate recipients of Snow's wrath were Essex (6/20) and Hampshire (5/29 & 5/51) to give Sussex their first two wins of the season. He and Illingworth sorted out their differences and "I was to know exactly where I stood with him as did every other player who came under his captaincy". He was recalled for the Second and Third Tests, which were won easily, but Snow took only three wickets (51.33), but by dint of being out only once that summer he averaged 50.00 with the bat. In 1969–71 Snow would make 276 runs (34.50) in Tests, so could be regarded as an all-rounder.

The Rest of the World 1970
I am very proud of the 19 wickets I took against the Rest of the World, even though, laughably, they have now been officially deducted from my Test playing record. They were earned the hard way against the best batsmen in the world, each trying to upstage the rest ... It was tough, very tough, but the whole exercise provided ideal practice for the coming tour of Australia.
John Snow

South Africa had been due to tour in 1970, but this was cancelled due to the Basil d'Oliveira Affair and concerns over anti-apartheid demonstrations that had led to barbed wire at Lord's. Rather than send an unprepared team to Australia the Rest of the World XI was created from the overseas cricketers playing in the County Championship led by Gary Sobers. They could not be regarded as a national Test team and the matches were given the status of "unofficial Tests", but the runs scored and wickets taken were added to official Test statistics until it was decided by the I.C.C. that they should not count. England was beaten by what was arguably the strongest Test team ever assembled and did well to win one of the "Tests" and strongly contest two others. Snow took 19 wickets (35.84) with 4/120 at Edgbaston, 4/82 at Headingley and 4/81 at The Oval.

The Ashes 1970–71See main articles English cricket team in Australia in 1970–71 and 1970–71 Ashes seriesI have not met John Snow, the outstanding personality and most dominating cricketer of the 1970–71 Anglo-Australian series... To me, he is one of the most faithful and effective servants Nemesis ever employed... Never did he lose that aura of menace. When he loped in to bowl he wore malevolence like Mandrake wore a cloak... But for him, Redpath, Walters, Ian Chappell and probably even Paul Sheahan must have bloomed as most of them did against the West Indians in 1968–69.
Richard Whitington
The highlight of Snow's Test career was the tour of Australia in 1970–71 where he was easily the best bowler of either side, taking 31 wickets (22.83) to help England regain The Ashes. He was repeatedly warned over his short-pitched bowling, but the Australians had no real answer to Snow's pace and fire.

In the First Test at Brisbane, Bill Lawry won the toss and decided to bat on a good wicket, but became Snow's 100th Test victim, caught by Alan Knott for 4. Australia reached 418–3, but Snow took four late wickets to dismiss them for 433, ending with 6/114.

He took 4/143 in the Second Test at Perth, having Australia 17/3 before they rebuilt their innings. Both these Tests were draws, and the Third was abandoned, Snow playing in the first One Day International as a result.

The Fourth Test, at Sydney, proved decisive. In the second innings Snow took his best Test bowling of 7/40. He soon dismissed Ian Chappell, Ian Redpath and Greg Chappell.  Australia were then overnight at 66/4. He then had Keith Stackpole caught out, followed by Rod Marsh for a duck. After Garth McKenzie retired hurt—hit in the face by a Snow bouncer—he bowled John Gleeson and Alan Connolly for ducks and Australia were all out for 116, Bill Lawry carrying his bat throughout the debacle. It was a superb piece of fast bowling from Snow, aggressive, hostile and decisive. England won by 299 runs, their biggest victory in Australia since 1936–37. They moved to 1–0 up in the series.

This margin was held until the Seventh and last Test, also held at Sydney.

The Snow–Jenner incident

At Sydney, Terry Jenner retired hurt when he ducked into a short delivery from Snow in the first innings. Umpire Lou Rowan warned the fast bowler for intimidatory bowling yet again, but Snow and Illingworth objected strongly, the captain saying "That's the only bouncer he's bowled" and that he would complain to the A.C.B. Rowan later said that Illingworth and Snow swore at him, which they denied. The bowler was loudly booed and "when he returned to his fielding position at long-leg Snow was pelted with bottles, cans and eaten pies".

Some of the crowd wanted to shake Snow's hand, but then he was grabbed by a drunk at Paddington Hill who was forced to let go by other spectators. In 1998 the eighty-year-old Trevor Guy told The Sydney Morning Herald that he was the man who had grabbed Snow in order to tell him what he thought about him hitting Jenner. Guy and Snow, in Australia for the 1998–99 Ashes series agreed that they had no hard feelings.

To avoid injury to his team, Illingworth took his men back to the dressing room without the permission of the umpires, an unprecedented move in Test cricket. The England manager Clark tried to push Illingworth back onto the field and Alan Barnes of the A.C.B. demanded that they return immediately or they would forfeit the match and the Ashes.p. 510, Frith A furious Illingworth said he would not return until the playing area had been cleared and the crowd had calmed down. Furthermore, he strongly objected to Clark's constantly siding with the Australians against his own team. It took seven minutes for the groundstaff to move the debris, during which one was hit on the head with a beer-can and had to be taken to hospital.

Jenner returned to bat at 235–8 and made a brave 30, last man out on 264 to give Australia a lead of 80 runs. England made 302 in their second innings and set Australia 223 to win. Snow took a wicket in his first over, but smashed his finger on the wooden boundary fence trying to catch a six off Keith Stackpole. He was taken to hospital for an operation under general anaesthetic to reconstruct his shattered finger bones. England's spinners did the job, dismissing Australia for 160 to win by 62 runs and regain the Ashes while Snow was on the operating table. He recovered in time to join in "the champagne-filled, beer-laden, hangover-inducing rejoicings of Sydney".

Snow's 31 wickets (22.83) was the most by an England bowler in Australia since Harold Larwood's 33 wickets (19.51) in 1932–33. No England bowler after Snow has taken 25 wickets in a Test series in Australia.

Trouble with management
Snow wrote that the series in Australia "emphasised the gulf between players and administrators" and "I was sick of the biased attitude and incompetence which was apparent in cricket administration". The M.C.C. tour manager was David Clark, described by Ray Illingworth as "an amiable, but somewhat ineffectual man". and there were soon divisions between him and the players.

After Snow had bowled more than 50 eight-ball overs in the First Test he was rested for the state match against Western Australia, but Clark insisted that he practice in the nets with the others. Snow bowled a couple of desultory overs and Clark berated him for five minutes after which Snow told him "that as far as my good conduct money was concerned he could swallow it" and went walkabout until the next day. Ray Illingworth smoothed things over, but after the Second Test Clark criticised both captains for cautious play, Snow for his short-pitched bowling and indicated that he would prefer to see Australia win 3–1 than see four more draws. The team only discovered this when they read the newspapers at the airport.

As a result, Illingworth effectively took over the running of the tour with the support of the players and Clark's influence declined. When the team returned to England Illingworth said that "all hell would break loose" if anyone was denied his good conduct bonus (as with Fred Trueman in the West Indies in 1953–54.), but this did not happen. However, Geoffrey Boycott and John Snow had to report to Lord's for a dressing down by the Secretary of the M.C.C. Billy Griffith for their behaviour.

Problems with umpires
<blockquote>I have never come across another umpire so full of his own importance, so stubborn, lacking in humour, unreasonable and utterly unable to distinguish between a delivery short of a length which rises around the height of the rib cage and a genuine bouncer which goes through head high, as Lou Rowan".
John Snow
Unbelievably after six Tests no Australian batsman had been given out lbw in the series, whereas five English wickets had fallen lbw, which was the clearest evidence of umpiring bias in the minds of the England players. 
In the Fifth Test Max O'Connell made the worst decision in the series when he called "over" and turned to walk to square leg after Snow bowled the last ball of the first over. As a result, he missed Alan Knott catching Keith Stackpole and had to give him not out. This was his first over in Test cricket and Snow "could quite understand his actions which illustrate the pressure umpires are also under in a Test", and they were able to joke about it afterwards.

Snow had more problems with Lou Rowan, a policeman who was inclined to stand on his authority and retired at the end of the series. In 1972 he wrote The Umpire's Story which was highly critical of the England team, particularly of Illingworth and Snow. It even queried "was John Snow actually grabbed by a spectator who objected to Snow flattening an Australian batsman?" regardless of photographic evidence to the contrary. In return Snow devoted a whole chapter to "Bitter Rows with Umpire Rowan" in his autobiography Cricket Rebel. Rowan in particular warned Snow for his short-pitched bowling and Snow thought this was partisanship as Alan Thomson was not called to book when he bowled bouncers at Snow and six in one eight-ball over against Ray Illingworth. Snow was twice warned by Rowan for intimidatory bowling in the Second Test at Perth, but refused to accept that rib-high balls were intimidatory and continued to bowl them. As a result, Snow was given an official warning, which meant that he would not be allowed to bowl if he was warned again. Illingworth told him that this was to be his last over in any case and the fast bowler sent his last ball flying over the head of Doug Walters, turned to Rowan and said "Now that's a bouncer for you".

India 1971

Snow was exhausted after the long tour of Australia and apart from his broken finger he suffered from a strained back and shoulder. He was dropped from the Sussex County team because his "bowling performances, and more especially his fielding have been so lacking in effort that the selection committee had no alternative". However, instead of playing for the Sussex Second XI Snow was declared unfit by his doctor and missed the first half of the season and the Test series against Pakistan. He recovered to take 4/45 & 7/73 against Essex

Snow was then picked for the First Test against India at Lord's. He rescued the England first innings when he came in at 183/7 and made 73 to hoist the total up to 304. This was Snow's highest Test and equal highest First Class score, but Snow was disappointed not to realise his boyhood dream of a century at Lord's when he was caught off a Chandrasekhar googly.

The Snow–Gavaskar incident
India needed 183 to win in the fourth innings. Snow had the opener Ashok Mankad caught by Knott for 8 and India were 21–2 when Sunil Gavaskar was called for a quick single after hitting the ball to mid-wicket. Snow went for the ball and knocked him over, "I could imagine the horror on the faces of everybody watching the game from the committee room at Lord's". They were both uninjured, got up and continued with the game after Snow tossed Gavaskar's bat back to him. A similar incident had happened in Georgetown in 1967–68 with Clive Lloyd, but the 5'4" Indian received far more sympathy than the 6'4" West Indian who had nearly trampled Snow into the ground. From afar the incident had looked much worse and was replayed repeated on slow-motion television with a media furore and press demanding disciplinary action. The replay can be seen in the Indian episode of the BBC documentary Empire of Cricket and it certainly appears that Snow consciously barged into Gavaskar as he knocked him over. Many were more angry about the throwing of the bat back than the knocking him over in the first place.

At lunch when Snow returned to the dressing room he apologised to the chairman of selectors Alec Bedser, and had promised to do so to Gavaskar when an enraged Billy Griffith charged in and shouted "That's the most disgusting thing I've ever seen on the field". Illingworth took him out and Snow waited until he had calmed down before apologising to Gavaskar on the field after lunch. When he later saw the replay he said "Oh well, the scene's been far too quiet without me anyway". and realised he could not avoid being dropped for the Second Test.

You may be too young to remember, but in 1971, during a Test match, I collided with England fast bowler John Snow and lost my bat. Snow picked it up and handed it to me. But at the time, many papers wrote that Snow had flung the bat at me. It all depends on your point of view, or what you are trying to portray...
Sunil Gavaskar

That first test was rained off with India needing 38 runs to win, but with only two wickets in hand.  Rain also caused the second test to be drawn.

Snow returned for the Third Test at The Oval and tore off Gavaskar's chain and medallion with a bouncer that zipped under his chin and made him fall over. He bowled the Indian for 6 in the first innings and had him lbw for a duck in the second, but this was not enough to prevent India winning the Test by four wickets and the series with it. 
This was only the second Test defeat Snow had seen since he had become an England regular in 1966 and ended England's run of 27 Tests without loss.

The Ashes 1972
There was no tour in 1971–72 and in 1972 Ian Chappell's young team came to fight the England veterans of 1970–71. England won the One Day Prudential Trophy 2–1, Snow taking 3–35 at Lord's. Australia lost the First Test at Old Trafford by 89 runs thanks to Snow, who took 4/41 & 4/87. They fought back at Lord's where Bob Massie's outrageous swing bowling took 16–137. However, Snow took 5/57 to peg back the Australians to a 36 run lead in the first innings, but couldn't stop Australia's first win in The Ashes for 13 Tests. At Trent Bridge in the drawn Third Test Snow dismissed Ian Chappell, Greg Chappell, Doug Walters, Ross Edwards and Bob Massie with 5/92 in the first innings and Keith Stackpole, Greg Chappell and Walters with 3/94 in the second as England held out for a draw. Snow took only two wickets at Headingley as "Deadly" Derek Underwood spun England to an Ashes retaining victory with 10/82, but he was the second highest scorer in the England first innings, adding 104 with Ray Illingworth (57) before he was stumped for 48 and given a standing ovation by the Yorkshire crowd. With The Ashes safe England lost the Fifth Test at The Oval by 5 wickets, Snow taking only one wicket after a Lillee bouncer bruised his wrist in the first innings, leading to more accusations that he did not try in the Australian fourth innings run chase. Even so, he was easily the biggest England wicket-taker with 24 wickets (23.12). It was a sad ending for the England team, many feeling that this was the last series in which the veteran 1970–71 team would play together as some players neared retirement, while others were unpopular with the selectors. Snow was under no illusions "as long as I was taking wickets I was safe. If I missed out then I would be on the way out".

New Zealand 1973
Along with Ray Illingworth, Geoff Boycott and John Edrich, John Snow declined to tour India in 1972–73, wanting to rest his back for the summer and concerned about the dysentery he had caught in Pakistan in 1968–69. Tony Lewis led the team, but lost 2–1 and Illingworth was re-appointed captain against New Zealand in 1973. In the First Test at Trent Bridge Snow took 3/23 as New Zealand were shot out for 97 in the first innings and lost by 38 runs, but went for 2/104 in the second innings and 3/109 at Lord's before bouncing back with 2/52 and 3/34 in the innings victory at Headingley. Geoff Arnold took the most wickets with 16 (21.93) and Snow's 13 wickets (24.61) suffered in comparison, but he returned 4–32 in England's 5 wicket win in the One Day International at Swansea.

West Indies 1973
Rohan Kanhai returned with the West Indies for the second half of the summer and more than made up the previous two series defeats with a 2–0 victory. They won the First Test at The Oval by 158 runs, Snow, bowled for 0 & 1 by Keith Boyce and hit for 0/71 in the first innings, was described as lethargic by his critics. The wickets of Rohan Kanhai, Clive Lloyd and Gary Sobers in the second innings (3/62) could not save him and he was dropped. He was aged only 31, but it appeared to be the end of his Test career. England were due to tour the Caribbean in 1973–74, but Illingworth was sacked within minutes of losing the disastrous Third Test at Lord's by an innings and 226 runs and Mike Denness was appointed instead.

England under Mike Denness 1973–75

Missed England tours
Mike Denness asked for Snow to go to the West Indies in 1973–74, remembering his record 27 wickets (18.66) in 1967–68, but the chairman of selectors Alec Bedser overruled him because Snow "was not a good team man". Denness drew the series 1–1, beat India 3–0 and drew 0–0 with Pakistan in 1974. He expressly asked for Snow for the upcoming tour of Australia, but when "Alec accepted the managership in Australia Snow’s chances flew out the window". Denness lost heavily to the hostile pace of Dennis Lillee and Jeff Thomson and despite numerous injuries to batsmen and bowlers alike Snow was not sent as a replacement.

South Africa 1973–74
As he could not tour the West Indies Snow toured with D.H. Robin's XI in South Africa with John Edrich and John Gleeson under the leadership of Brian Close, who was a strong advocate of maintaining cricketing ties. Despite playing two "Tests" against a South African Invitation XI the tour did not produce the strong reaction encountered by the "Rebel" tours of the 1980s. Snow took 18 wickets (22.83) including 4/91 in the Durban "Test", they beat Natal and Eastern Province and drew the other games.

World Cup 1975
The inaugural World Cup was held in England in 1975
and Snow was recalled after the Australian disaster. He took 0/24 off 12 overs against India at Lord's in England's record 202-run victory, 4/11 against East Africa at Edgbaston, his best bowling in a One Day International, and 2/32 off 12 overs against Australia as England lost the semi-final at Headingley. His total of 6 wickets (10.83) was the third best average in the series and the best for England.

England and WSC under Tony Greig 1975–79

The Ashes 1975
South Africa had been due to tour in 1975, but that series had been cancelled years before and the Australians were asked to stay for a four Test series after the World Cup. Snow was recalled after almost two years for the First Test at Edgbaston and was the best England bowler with 3/86, but Australia won by an innings and it cost Denness the captaincy. He was replaced by Tony Greig, a combative 6'7" South African born all-rounder who had been Snow's Sussex team-mate since 1967 and county captain from 1972. He led England to three draws, starting in the Second Test at Lord's, though Snow took 4/66 to dismiss Alan Turner, Ian Chappell and Greg Chappell and have Australia reeling at 37/3 in their first innings. 
As a conversation piece people have frequently asked me which of my many wickets has given me the most pleasure...I no longer stop to think. My answer does not concern one wicket but three. Those of Alan Turner and the Chappell brothers, Ian and Greg...I felt each one proved a point. That I was not over the hill as a Test fast bowler despite having been ignored for eight Test matches at home and two tours abroad. Each of these three batsman was well beaten by a good delivery, two out leg before and Ian Chappell caught behind. Down at leg after that opening spell I bloody nearly cried.
John Snow

Snow took 3/22 at Headingley and finished the series with 11 wickets (32.27), more than any other England player.

West Indies 1976
There was no England tour in 1975–76, but Snow toured Rhodesia with the International Cavaliers, taking 4–36 and hitting 36 not out in the second match at Salisbury. The West Indies toured England in 1976, and their captain Clive Lloyd took offence at Grieg's claim that he would make them "grovel" and the West Indies won the series 3–0 in the Guyanan's first great series victory. Viv Richards made an imperial 829 runs (118.32) and three centuries, but Snow still managed a haul of 15 wickets (28.20). Only Derek Underwood took more wickets for England – 17 wickets (37.11) – and only Bob Willis averaged less – 7 wickets (26.00). He was punished in the first innings at 
Trent Bridge (1/123), but fought back in the second innings (4/53) with the wickets of Roy Fredericks, Viv Richards, Clive Lloyd and Bernard Julien. With England wanting a draw Snow slowed down the game by stuffing bread-crumbs in his pocket during lunch and scattering them over the wicket. Umpire Dickie Bird had to use his cap to scare away the pigeons that kept flying down to eat them. In the end the veterans John Edrich and Brian Close grimly held out for a draw amongst fast, short-pitched bowling. Snow struck again at Lord's with 4/68 as he and Underwood (5/39) shot the tourists out for 182, but asked to make 332 to win they held out for 241/6. Snow was dropped for the Third Test at Old Trafford, which England lost by 425 runs, but was recalled for his final Test at Headingley. Here he reduced the West Indians from 413–5 to 450 all out with 4/77, including his 200th Test wicket, Andy Roberts, and took 2/82 in the second but England lost by 55 runs.

World Series Cricket 1977–79
Late in 1976 Snow got in trouble by wearing illegal advertising on his cricket clothing, and more when he published an autobiography Cricket Rebel, which was highly critical about the administration of Sussex County Cricket Club and the M.C.C. at Lord's. He called for better playing conditions, improved pay, four-day county matches and international umpires. He also married his wife Jenny, having delayed because "the wife of a regular Test cricketer has a pretty rough time... with the husband away half the summer and most winters". He still had a formidable reputation in Australia and was recruited by Tony Greig for Kerry Packer's World Series Cricket. The secret came out at a party held by Greig during the rain affected Sussex vs Australians match of 1977 and there was widespread condemnation by the press and cricketing authorities. Before the start of the 1978 season Snow and Greig had their Sussex contracts cancelled and successfully went to court with Mike Procter when the T.C.C.B. tried to ban them from First-class cricket. He did not play in any of the "Supertests", but was regular for the World XI and WSC Cavaliers in the one-day games, hitting 42 and taking 3/30 to help win the final against Australia at Canberra in 1977–78.

Later life
After World Series Cricket, and at the age of 38, Snow returned to play six Sunday League Cricket games and a Gillette cup match for Warwickshire taking 8 wickets (29.62), making 57 runs (57.00). Retiring from cricket he set up a successful travel agency with the money he made from Packer. Snow became a director of the Sussex Cricket Club, but resigned in 2009. and continues to play in charity matches.

Poetry
Snow published two volumes of poetry; Contrasts in 1971 by Fuller d'Arch Smith Limited and Moments and Thoughts in 1973 by Kaye and Ward Limited. Both collections are contained in his autobiography Cricket Rebel.

One poem "Lord's Test" "penned in verse my feelings and impressions about what it is like to play at the headquarters of world cricket" during the Test against the West Indies in 1969, where he took 5/114 in the first innings. A television firm heard of the poem and arranged to film him at Lord's in the First Test against New Zealand later that summer. They could then make a fifteen-minute programme about his poem with John Betjeman, but this was cancelled when Snow was dropped for ill-discipline.

Character and philosophy
Snow has agreed that he is an inward looking person but says: "I do not withdraw from other players off the field or regard myself as a loner." Asked if he was 'a man of moods', Snow said "Yes, I suppose to a certain extent I am. ... I get fed up and down in the mouth some days, but if I give the impression of being in a bad temper it is more often than not with myself."

Snow was active in reading, music, painting, and poetry. In July 1971 at the England team's Harrogate hotel during the fourth Test at Leeds, Basil d'Oliveira in an animated dinner table conversation said to Snow "The ultimate thing in life is to play for England." Snow replied quietly "The ultimate thing in life is death."

Snow was generous in helping other bowlers, including Imran Khan in a remodelling of his action to enable fast bowling (a similar change to the one Snow had himself undergone), and Dennis Lillee in bowling leg cutters.

Personal life
Snow married Jenny Matthews in 1976. He had known her for many years, but had delayed marrying because "the wife of a regular Test cricketer has a pretty rough time" due to time away touring and playing.

In popular culture 
John Snow is mentioned in a verse of the Roy Harper song When an Old Cricketer Leaves the Crease from the album HQ (1975) though the album was renamed after the song for its release in the United States. The song uses the sport of cricket as a metaphor for death and mentions Snow alongside another England cricketer from the time Geoffrey Boycott, both by first name only in the line "And it could be Geoff and it could be John". The song is dedicated to both of them.

Further reading
 Peter Arnold, The Illustrated Encyclopaedia of World of Cricket, W.H. Smith, 1985
 Dickie Bird with Keuth Lodge, My Autobiography, Hodder & Stoughton, 1997
 Geoffrey Boycott, Boycott: The Autobiography, Pan Books, 2006
 Ashley Brown, A Pictorial History of Cricket, Bison Books Ltd, 1988
 Greg Chappell, Old Hands Showed The Way, Test Series Official Book 1986–87, The Clashes for the Ashes, Australia vs England, Playbill Sport Publication, 1986
 Ian Chappell and Ashley Mallett, Hitting Out: The Ian Chappell Story, Orion, 2006
 Bill Frindall, The Wisden Book of Test Cricket 1877–1978, Wisden, 1979
 Colin Firth, Pageant of Cricket, The MacMillan Company of Australia,1987
 Criss Freddi, The Guinness Book of Cricket Blunders, Guinness Publishing, 1996
 Tony Greig, My Story, Stanley Paul, 1980
 Ken Kelly and David Lemmon, Cricket Reflections: Five Decades of Cricket Photographs, Heinemann, 1985
 Dennis Lillee, Lillee, My Life in Cricket, Methuen Australia, 1982
 Dennis Lillee, Menace: the Autobiography, Headline Book Publishing, 2003
 Brian Luckhurst and Mike Baldwin, Boot Boy to president, KOS Media, 2004
 Adrian McGregor, Greg Chappell, Collins, 1985
 Mansoor Ali Khan Pataudi, Tiger's Tail, Stanley Paul, 1969
 Ray Robinson, On Top Down Under, Cassell, 1975
 Lou Rowan, The Umpires Story with an Analysis of the laws of cricket, Jack Pollard, 1972
 John Snow, Cricket Rebel: An Autobiography, Hamlyn Publishing Ltd, 1976
 Mike Stevenson, Illy: A Biography of Ray Illingworth, Midas Books, 1978
 E.W. Swanton, Swanton in Australia with MCC 1946–1975, Fontana, 1977
 E.W. Swanton (ed), The Barclays World of Cricket, Collins, 1986
 Derek Underwood, Beating the Bat: An Autobiography, Stanley Paul, 1975
 Richard Whitington, Captains Outrageous? Cricket in the seventies, Stanley Paul, 1972
 Bob Willis, Lasting the Pace, Collins, 1985

DVD
 David Steele, England Cricket Six of the Best: The Seventies, A Sharpe Focus Production for Green Umbrella, 2009 (showing Snow's 7/40 in the Fourth Test at Sydney in 1970–71, his 48 in the Fourth Test at Headingley in 1972 and his 3/22 in the Second Test at Headlingley in 1975)

References
 47 catches in 9 ODIs.
It is wrong

External links 
 

1941 births
Living people
People from Wychavon (district)
England One Day International cricketers
England Test cricketers
English cricketers of 1969 to 2000
English cricketers
People educated at Christ's Hospital
Sussex cricketers
Warwickshire cricketers
International Cavaliers cricketers
Cricketers at the 1975 Cricket World Cup
Wisden Cricketers of the Year
World Series Cricket players
People from Bognor Regis
Marylebone Cricket Club cricketers
D. H. Robins' XI cricketers
Cricketers from Worcestershire